Tuan Wreh (born 23 November 1979) is a retired Liberian triple jumper.

He finished seventh at the 2002 African Championships, fourth at the 2006 African Championships, fourth at the 2007 All-Africa Games, sixth at the 2010 African Championships and ninth at the 2011 All-Africa Games. In the long jump, he finished eleventh at the 2002 African Championships.

His personal best jump is 16.65 metres, achieved in June 2008 in New York. He holds the Liberian record.

References

1979 births
Living people
Liberian triple jumpers
Place of birth missing (living people)
Athletes (track and field) at the 2007 All-Africa Games
Athletes (track and field) at the 2011 All-Africa Games
African Games competitors for Liberia